The Delaware Oaks Stakes is an American Thoroughbred horse race run annually in mid July at Delaware Park Racetrack in  Stanton near Wilmington, Delaware.

Part of the Del Cap Festival Weekend that features other races over the two days including the Delaware Handicap, the Oaks is open to three-year-old fillies and is run over one and one-sixteenth miles on the dirt.

Currently, the Grade III race offers a purse of $300,000.

Historical notes
The inaugural running of the Delaware Oaks took place on June 28, 1938 and was won by Isabel Dodge Sloane's filly Handcuff.

Coming off her June 6, 1941 win in the Top Flight Handicap at New York's Belmont Park, Tangled won the Oaks for the Greentree Stable of Helen Hay Whitney. Trained and ridden by future U.S. Racing Hall of Fame inductees John Gaver Sr. and Eddie Arcaro, the filly beat her closest rival by nine lengths while setting a new track record with a winning time of 1:49 4/5 for a mile and one-eighth on dirt.

United States Hall of Fame fillies Gallorette (1945), Dark Mirage (1968), Gallant Bloom (1969) and Desert Vixen (1973) have all won this race, as did the Canadian Horse Racing Hall of Fame inductee Lauries Dancer in 1971.

Records
Speed record:
 1:41.79  @ 1 1–16 miles: Calamity Kate (2015)
 1:48.20  @ 1 1–8 miles: Cum Laude Laurie (1977)

Most wins by a jockey:
 4 - Eddie Arcaro (1940, 1941, 1945, 1955)

Most wins by a trainer:
 4 - James E. Fitzsimmons (1939, 1942, 1946, 1955)

Most wins by an owner:
 3 - Belair Stud Stable (1939, 1942, 1946)
 3 - Christiana Stables (1947, 1972, 1974)
 3 - King Ranch (1956, 1959, 1969)

Winners

References

Graded stakes races in the United States
Flat horse races for three-year-old fillies
Horse races in Delaware
Recurring sporting events established in 1938
Delaware Park Racetrack
1938 establishments in Delaware